Augustus Ledyard Smith (April 5, 1833 – October 12, 1902) was an American educator, businessman, and politician.

Biography
Born in Middletown, Connecticut, Smith graduated from Wesleyan University in 1854. He then taught at University of Wisconsin in Madison, Wisconsin. Smith also taught mathematics at the United States Naval Academy. Smith was the editor of the Fond du Lac Union newspaper for two years. He then served as secretary/treasurer and land agent of the Green Bay and Mississippi Canal Company, later known as the Fox River Improvement Company. Smith lived in Appleton, Wisconsin. In 1866 and 1867, Smith served in the Wisconsin State Senate and was a Democrat. He was appointed regent of the University of Wisconsin. In 1870, Smith served as mayor of Appleton, Wisconsin. He died at his home in Appleton, Wisconsin.

Notes

1833 births
1902 deaths
Politicians from Middletown, Connecticut
Politicians from Appleton, Wisconsin
Wesleyan University alumni
United States Naval Academy faculty
University of Wisconsin–Madison faculty
Businesspeople from Wisconsin
Editors of Wisconsin newspapers
Mayors of places in Wisconsin
Democratic Party Wisconsin state senators
19th-century American politicians
19th-century American businesspeople